Dudleya blochmaniae is a summer-deciduous succulent plant known by the common names Blochman's liveforever or Blochman's dudleya. This species of Dudleya survives part of the year with no aboveground presence, surviving as underground corm-like roots in deciduous months. It is characterized by white, star-shaped and spreading flowers that emerge after sufficient rainfall. It is found along the Pacific coast of the California Floristic Province, from the vicinity of San Luis Obispo in California to Punta Colonet in Baja California.

Description

Vegetative morphology 
This plant forms a basal rosette from an underground corm. The small rosette is around only 0.5 to 7 cm, and the leaves are summer deciduous. The leaves are 1 to 6 cm long, more or less shaped, oblanceolate to club-shaped, and when removed from the plant, the point of detachment will turn red with the wound. The leaves are 1 to 4 mm wide, and their tip is acute to rounded. The leaf petiole is more or less narrow.

Reproductive morphology 
The inflorescence branches 2 to 3 times, and then may or may not rebranch once more. The terminal branches on the inflorescence are 1 to 6 cm long, and have 3 to 10 flowers. The lower bracts on the inflorescence are often more than twice as long as they are wide. The pedicels are less than 1 mm long. The flower is white and star shaped. The sepals are 1.5 to 4 mm long, shaped deltate to ovate. The petals spread from the base, and are 5 to 10 mm large, shaped elliptic, with an acute tip, and colored white. The keel of the petals is often lined with a red-lineolate color.

Subdivisions 
Named subspecies include:

Conservation 
This species is of conservation concern, as suitable habitat sites are rapidly declining and face serious threats. Threats include development, urbanization, vehicles, recreation, grazing by feral herbivores, and exotic plants. In 1998 there were only twenty-four confirmed extant sites in California, out of a total of thirty-six sites. In Baja California, this species is represented from fewer than five occurrences.

Cultivation 
This species is a corm-like succulent that flowers in late spring to early summer. It often blooms less than a year after being sowed. Plants may disappear if they are placed in locations with high rainfall.

References

External links
Calflora Database: Dudleya blochmaniae  (Blochman's dudleya,  Blochman's liveforever)
 Jepson Manual eFlora (TJM2) treatment of  Dudleya blochmaniae
USDA Plants Profile for Dudleya blochmaniae (Blochman's liveforever)
 UC CalPhotos gallery of Dudleya blochmaniae (Blochman's Dudleya)

blochmaniae
Flora of California
Flora of Baja California
Natural history of the California chaparral and woodlands
Natural history of the Channel Islands of California
Natural history of the Santa Monica Mountains
Taxa named by Alice Eastwood
Taxa named by Reid Venable Moran